Sockbridge and Tirril is a civil parish in the Eden District, Cumbria, England.  It contains 27 listed buildings that are recorded in the National Heritage List for England.  All the listed buildings are designated at Grade II, the lowest of the three grades, which is applied to "buildings of national importance and special interest".  The parish contains the adjacent villages of Sockbridge and Tirril and the surrounding countryside.  Most of the listed buildings are in the villages, and are mainly houses and associated structures, farmhouses and farm buildings.  The other listed buildings in the villages are a cross base and a public house, and outside the village they are a boundary post and a farmhouse.


Buildings

Notes and references

Notes

Citations

Sources

Lists of listed buildings in Cumbria